A thumb rest is a device that helps the player of certain woodwind instruments to keep them in the correct position and to facilitate his playing (embouchure, posture, fingerings). The instruments are mainly clarinets, oboes, saxophones and flutes.

History 
Historically, woodwind instruments were first made from boxwood and fruitwood; they were relatively compact and light, and they did not have a thumb rest. The need arose from about 1830 with the increase in the number of keys in wind instruments and the switch to exotic woods, especially grenadilla from Mozambique, which made the instruments heavier.

Around 1860, the co-inventor of the Boehm clarinet Hyacinthe Klosé made the thumb rest generally accepted in France by means of his méthode complète de clarinette, after he too had switched to making his clarinets from grenadilla.

The thumb rest was either carved from the solid wood or screwed onto the body of the instrument as a metal part. The clarinetist and clarinet maker Iwan Müller is considered the inventor of the thumb rest. In fact, however, it was developed independently by various woodwind instrument makers. In the time before that, many clarinettists put the mouthpiece on the clarinet in such a way that the reed was on top (over-blowing instead of the under-blowing with the reed on the lower lip that is common today), because they could hold the instrument better that way.

The saxophone has had a thumb rest since its creation in 1849. The Selmer Mark VI saxophone model from Henri Selmer Paris, which revolutionised the ergonomics of this instrument when it was introduced in 1954, had an adjustable thumb rest made of plastic or metal.

The side of the thumb rest that comes into contact with the finger is usually fitted with a glued-on cork or rubber pad to protect the finger. Some musicians develop a callus in this contact area. Some thumb rests have a device that allows the use of a strap to relieve the thumb.

Support on the bassoon 
Instead of a thumb rest, bassoonists use a hand rest on the German bassoon (Heckel system). The French bassoon does without one.

Thumb rests and musculoskeletal disorders 
To counter musculoskeletal disorders (chronic pains), there are now ergonomic thumb rests that distribute the weight of the instrument over the whole thumb and/or the thumb and wrist. Some of these supports can also be combined with a strap.

Gallery

References

Sources

Patents
 
 
 

Clarinets
Saxophones
Oboes
Bassoons